Mount Priestley is a mountain, rising at the north side of David Glacier, 5 nautical miles (9 km) southwest of Mount Bellingshausen, in the Prince Albert Mountains of Victoria Land. First mapped by the British Antarctic Expedition, 1907–09, which named it for Raymond (later Sir Raymond) E. Priestley, geologist with the expedition, who was later a member of the British Antarctic Expedition, 1910–13.

Prince Albert Mountains
Mountains of Victoria Land
Scott Coast